Barbara Anderson is a British athlete who won five gold medals at the Paralympic Games. A multi-discipline athlete, Anderson found particular success in class 1 swimming events in which she won three of her gold medals. Her other two gold medals came in table tennis both as an individual and with Jane Blackburn in the women's doubles. Anderson won a silver in the Mixed St. Nicholas Round Team tetraplegic archery event alongside Blackburn and Tommy Taylor as well as a silver in the individual event.

References

British disabled sportspeople
Paralympic gold medalists for Great Britain
Paralympic silver medalists for Great Britain
Sportswomen with disabilities
British female archers
British female table tennis players
British female swimmers
Swimmers with disabilities
Archers with disabilities
Paralympic table tennis players of Great Britain
Possibly living people
Year of birth missing
Place of birth missing
Medalists at the 1960 Summer Paralympics
Medalists at the 1972 Summer Paralympics
Paralympic medalists in swimming
Paralympic medalists in table tennis
Paralympic medalists in archery
Swimmers at the 1960 Summer Paralympics
Archers at the 1972 Summer Paralympics
Table tennis players at the 1960 Summer Paralympics
Table tennis players at the 1972 Summer Paralympics
Paralympic archers of Great Britain